The 41st Writers Guild of America Awards honored the best television, and film writers of 1988. Winners were announced in 1989.

Winners & Nominees

Film 
Winners are listed first highlighted in boldface.

Television

Documentary

Special Awards

References

External links 

 WGA.org

1988
W
1988 in American cinema
1988 in American television